The Samsung NX10 is a 14.0 effective megapixel APS-C crop CMOS mirrorless interchangeable lens digital camera made by Samsung. It was announced on January 4, 2010 and is one of the first mirrorless cameras with an APS-C sized sensor. Samsung NX11 replaces NX10 in manufacturing since February 2011.

Features
 15.1 Megapixel APS-C CMOS sensor with 14.6 million effective pixels (successor of the Pentax K20D sensor)
 Proprietary Samsung NX-mount
 JPEG and raw (TIFF-based proprietary) formats are used
 Up to 720p movie capture (H.264, 30 frame/s)
 Fast contrast-detect autofocus
 3.0" AMOLED screen (614k dots, RGB array with subpixel rendering (PenTile)
 921k dots electronic viewfinder
 HDMI 1.3 CEC technology (Anynet+) enabled interface
 DRIMe II Pro processor
 Ultrasound sensor cleaning system
 Samsung i-Function (since firmware ver. 1.20)
 Optional GPS adapter
 Panorama photo (since firmware ver. 1.30)

See also
 Samsung NX series
 Samsung NX-mount

References

External links 

 Official page Samsung site.
 New eyes for the world – SamsungImaging.
 Review on ePHOTOzine.
 Big review on DPReview.
 Tests on DigitalCameraInfo.
 Review on CNET.
 Comparing NX10 on PCMag.
 FaceBook NX Fan Page.

Live-preview digital cameras
NX10
Cameras introduced in 2010